Robert Galley (11 January 1921 – 8 June 2012) was a French politician and member of the Free French Forces during World War II, for which he received the Ordre de la Libération.

The son of a doctor, Galley was born in Paris on January 11, 1921. During the Fall of France in 1940, Galley was able to escape to the United Kingdom disguised as a Polish soldier. He joined the Free French Forces and was sent to North Africa, including the Battle of El Alamein. Galley was next stationed within General Philippe Leclerc de Hauteclocque's 2nd Armored Division, through which he participated in the Liberation of Paris and the Western Allied invasion of Germany. Galley later married General Leclerc de Hauteclocque's daughter, Jeanne Leclerc de Hauteclocque, following the end of World War II.

After the war, Galley passed the entrance examinations to the French graduate engineering schools and was admitted to the Ecole Centrale Paris, from which he graduated in 1949.

He worked and held various positions in areas of petroleum, nuclear energy, and informatics. From 1955 to 1966 he headed the construction of various nuclear plants and research facilities for the CEA. He was the Deputy Information Officer to the French Prime Minister and Chairman of the Board of Directors of INRIA in 1967.

Galley began his political career in 1968. He served as a government minister for fourteen consecutive years within the administrations of three French Presidents - Charles de Gaulle, Georges Pompidou and Valéry Giscard d'Estaing. Galley held the portfolios of Minister of Infrastructure, Minister of Housing, Minister of Research and Space, Minister of Telecommunications, Minister of Transportation, Minister of Defence from 1973 to 1974,  and Minister of Cooperation from 1976 to 1980.

Galley also served as Mayor of Troyes from 1972 to 1995.

Robert Galley died in Troyes, France, on June 8, 2012, at the age of 91.

References

1921 births
2012 deaths
Lycée Louis-le-Grand alumni
École Centrale Paris alumni
Free French military personnel of World War II
Companions of the Liberation
French Ministers of Defence
French Ministers of Public Works
French Ministers of Posts, Telegraphs, and Telephones
Transport ministers of France
Government ministers of France
Mayors of places in Grand Est
People from Troyes
Deputies of the 11th National Assembly of the French Fifth Republic
Senators of Aube